Richard Ling (Rich Ling) is a communications scholar who focuses on mobile communication. He was the  Shaw Foundation Professor of Media Technology at Nanyang Technological University, Singapore (2013-2021). He has also lived and worked in Norway. He has studied the social consequences of mobile communication, text messaging and mobile telephony. He has examined the use of mobile communication for what he calls micro-coordination, used by teens, and use in generational situations, as a form of social cohesion. Most recently he has studied this in the context of large databases and also in developing countries. He has published extensively in this area and is widely cited. He was named a Fellow of the International Communication Association in 2016. He was named editor of the Journal of Computer-Mediated Communication in 2017.

Biography

Rich Ling is a fourth-generation Coloradoan who grew up near Brighton, Colorado. He earned his Ph.D. in sociology from the University of Colorado, Boulder, in 1984. He has taught at the University of Wyoming in Laramie at IT University of Copenhagen and most recently at Nanyang Technological University in Singapore. He has also been a researcher for the Norwegian telecommunications company Telenor.

Ling has lived in Scandinavia, specifically Norway, for more than two decades. He worked at the Gruppen for Ressursstudier ("the resource study group") established by Jørgen Randers and has been a partner in the consulting firm Ressurskonsult, focusing on interactions between energy, technology, and society. He was a member of the Telenor R&D team where he continues to have a connection. He has also been the Pohs visiting professor of Communication Studies at the University of Michigan in Ann Arbor, where he continues to have an adjunct position.

In 2012, Ling was a founder of the journal, Mobile Media and Communication, published by SAGE. He currently co-edits the journal. He is also a founding co-editor of the Oxford University Press series on mobile communication. He was also Editor-in-Chief of the Journal of Computer-Mediated Communication.

Ling moved to Singapore in 2014, where he held an endowed chair in the Wee Kim Wee School of Communication and Information at Nanyang Technological University. He headed a research team that focuses on mobile communication in Myanmar and elsewhere in Southeast Asia.

Work

Ling is known for his work on the social consequences of mobile communication. His notion of micro-coordination (see: "Hyper-coordination via Mobile Phones in Norway" written with Birgitte Yttri) describes what is likely one of the major social consequences of the diffusion of mobile communication into society. He has also described how mobile communication increases social cohesion in small groups and how it has become structured into society.

His book Taken for Grantedness (MIT Press 2012) examines how mobile communication has become a structured part of society with a position that can be compared in some ways to that of mechanical timekeeping. This book has been the subject of a review in journal Science. Prior to this he published the book New Tech, New Ties (MIT 2008) that won the 2009 Goffman Award from the Media Ecology Association. He is also the author of a book on the social consequences of mobile telephony titled The Mobile Connection (Morgan Kaufmann) and along with Jonathan Donner he has written the book Mobile Phones and Mobile Communication.

Ling is a founding co-editor of the SAGE journal Mobile Media and Communication (along with Veronika Karnowski, Thilo von Pape and Steve Jones). In 2017 he was named Editor-in-Chief of the Journal of Computer-Mediated Communication. He is also a founding editor (along with Gerard Goggin and Leopoldina Fortunati) of the Oxford University Press series on mobile communication. He has been the co-editor, along with Scott Campbell, of the Mobile Communication Research Series. He is an associate editor for journals The Information Society, the Journal of Computer-Mediated Communication, the Journal of Communication as well as Information Technology and International Development. Ling has received recognition as an outstanding scholar from the International Communication Association (The 2010 CROF Award), Rutgers University, and the Telenor Research Award in 2009. He has been interviewed on The Discovery Channel, National Public Radio and Norwegian TV as well as for periodicals such as The New York Times, The Economist, the Los Angeles Times, Der Spiegel, Newsweek, Época (Brazil), Wired, Toronto's The Globe and Mail, Norwegian publications such as Aftenposten, VG, and Dagbladet and Danish publications such as Politiken.

References

External links
 Ling's Research Gate page

Living people
1954 births
People from Brighton, Colorado
Academic staff of Nanyang Technological University